The Nemzeti Bajnokság I/B is the second-tier league for Hungarian men's handball clubs. It is administered by the Hungarian Handball Federation. The league is divided into two groups, a Western one and an Eastern one. Fourteen teams compete in each group and the group winners gain automatic promotion to the NB I.

Champions by year

Teams 
The following teams participate in the 2013–14 season:

References 
 The history and statistics of the Hungarian Leagues

External links 
 Official Site of the Hungarian Handball Federation
 Statistics for Hungarian Leagues

Handball leagues in Hungary
Professional sports leagues in Hungary